Batrachosauria ("Frog Saurians") is a name given either to very reptile-like amphibians dating from the Carboniferous and Permian periods, or to amniotes and those amphibians very closely related to them. In current cladistic schemes, Batrachosauria is the sister clade to the Anthracosauroidea

Characteristics
From the Palaeos website:

 Intercentrum reduced
 large canine-like maxillary tooth

See also
 Reptiliomorpha

References

External links
 Palaeos  Batrachosauria

Reptiliomorphs